Dirty pop may refer to:
 Dirty Pop, a music duo consisting of Drew G. and Brian Cua
 Dirty Pop with Lance Bass, a radio show featuring NSYNC's Lance Bass
 a lyric in the NSYNC song "Pop"

See also
 Dirty Pop-Up, a limited run shop from NSYNC
 Dirty Pop Fantasy album by Regurgitator
 Dirty rap, a subgenre of hip hop music